Brooklyn Nine-Nine is an American police procedural comedy television series created by Dan Goor and Michael Schur. The series revolves around Jake Peralta (Andy Samberg), a detective for the New York City Police Department (NYPD) in Brooklyn's fictional 99th Precinct, who often comes into conflict with his new commanding officer, the serious and stern Captain Raymond Holt (Andre Braugher). The rest of the cast features Stephanie Beatriz as Rosa Diaz, Terry Crews as Terry Jeffords, Melissa Fumero as Amy Santiago, Joe Lo Truglio as Charles Boyle, Chelsea Peretti as Gina Linetti, Dirk Blocker as Michael Hitchcock, and Joel McKinnon Miller as Norm Scully.

Throughout its run, the series has been acclaimed by critics for the performances of its cast, especially Samberg and Braugher, who have both been nominated for fourteen awards each. While Samberg has won a Golden Globe Award for Best Actor – Television Series Musical or Comedy, Braugher has been nominated for four Primetime Emmy Awards for Outstanding Supporting Actor in a Comedy Series and has won two Critics' Choice Television Awards for Best Supporting Actor in a Comedy Series. In addition, Beatriz has received six award nominations, winning an Imagen Award for Best Supporting Actress – Television and two Gracie Awards for Outstanding Actress in a Supporting Role – Comedy or Musical. Furthermore, stunt performer Norman Howell has been nominated for the Primetime Emmy Award for Outstanding Stunt Coordination for a Comedy Series or Variety Program six times, winning twice.

The series has also received particular praise for its portrayal of serious issues whilst retaining a sense of humor. For its representation of LGBTQ+ people, the series won a GLAAD Media Award for Outstanding Comedy Series. The series has been nominated for eleven Emmy Awards, consisting of four nominations for Primetime Emmy Awards and seven for Creative Arts Emmy Awards. Additionally, the show has been nominated for seven Teen Choice Awards, six Satellite Awards, eight NAACP Image Awards, and two Golden Globes. As of 2021, Brooklyn Nine-Nine has won fifteen awards out of a total of eighty-one nominations.

Awards and nominations

Notes

References

External links
 

Awards
Brooklyn Nine-Nine